HMS Esk was a 21-gun  screw corvette launched on 12 June 1854 from J. Scott Russell & Co., Millwall.  She saw action in the Crimean War, the Second Opium War and the Tauranga Campaign in New Zealand, and was broken up at Portsmouth in 1870.

Design
Esk was built in exchange for HMS Greenock (which went to the Australian Royal Mail Co.) by J. Scott Russell & Co. The words of the Admiralty Order stated she should be "a wood screw vessel complete of Highflyers [class] in exchange when built". This made her a small wooden frigate to a design by the Surveyor's Department of the Admiralty on 25 April 1847; she and her sister Highflyer were redesignated as corvettes in 1854.  In common with other screw corvettes of the time, she was envisaged as a steam auxiliary, intended to cruise under sail with the steam engine available for assistance.  Commensurately she was provided with a full square sailing rig. Her oscillating two-cylinder inclined single-expansion steam engine, provided by the builders, was quite different from Highflyers, but developed broadly the same power —  — and drove a single screw.

Construction
She was laid down in April 1853 in the Millwall yard of J. Scott Russell & Co. on the River Thames. She was launched on 12 June 1854 and commissioned at Woolwich on 21 December 1854.

Service history
She served in the Mediterranean Station between 1854 until 1856 and was in the Black Sea during the Crimean War. She was part of the East Indies Station between 1856 until 1863, where she participated in Second Opium War at Canton. Afterwards she went to the Australia Station, where she participated in the attack on Gate Pā during the Tauranga Campaign in New Zealand. Her commanding officer Captain John Fane Charles Hamilton was killed in the attack. She left the Australia Station on 2 July 1867.

Fate
Arriving back in Britain in 1867, she was paid off in 1868 and was broken up in 1870 at Portsmouth.

References and sources
References

Sources
Bastock, John (1988), Ships on the Australia Station, Child & Associates Publishing Pty Ltd; Frenchs Forest, Australia. 

1854 ships
Ships built in Millwall
Corvettes of the Royal Navy
Victorian-era corvettes of the United Kingdom